Marco Canola (born 26 December 1988) is an Italian racing cyclist, who currently rides for UCI ProTeam .

Major results

2009
 7th Trofeo Città di Brescia
 9th Trofeo Gianfranco Bianchin
2010
 3rd Trofeo Zsšdi
 3rd Trofeo Alcide Degasperi
 3rd Giro Valli Aretine
 6th Giro del Casentino
 6th GP Capodarco
 7th Gran Premio Palio del Recioto
 7th Trofeo Gianfranco Bianchin
 10th Trofeo Franco Balestra
2011
 1st Overall Giro del Veneto
1st Stage 2
 4th Giro Valli Aretine
 5th Trofeo Gianfranco Bianchin
2012
 1st Stage 7 Tour de Langkawi
 1st Stage 1b (TTT) Giro di Padania
2013
 10th Gran Premio Nobili Rubinetterie
2014
 1st Stage 13 Giro d'Italia
 1st  Mountains classification, Tirreno–Adriatico
 4th Giro di Toscana
2015
 1st  Mountains classification, Critérium International
 5th Overall Dubai Tour
 10th Vuelta a Murcia
2016
 1st  Points classification, Tour de Taiwan
 3rd Philadelphia International Cycling Classic
 4th Winston-Salem Cycling Classic
2017
 1st Japan Cup
 1st Volta Limburg Classic
 1st Stage 7 Tour of Utah
 2nd Coppa Ugo Agostoni
 3rd Trofeo Matteotti
 6th Gran Premio di Lugano
 7th Grand Prix of Aargau Canton
 7th Gran Premio Bruno Beghelli
 8th Overall Tour of Japan
1st  Points classification
1st Stages 2, 3 & 5
 8th Overall Giro di Toscana
 8th Brussels Cycling Classic
 8th Coppa Sabatini
2018
 2nd Overall Tour du Limousin
 2nd GP Industria & Artigianato di Larciano
 3rd Grand Prix of Aargau Canton
 4th Coppa Sabatini
 6th Giro dell'Appennino
 6th Japan Cup
2019
 1st Stage 4 Tour of Utah
 6th Giro dell'Appennino
 8th Coppa Sabatini
 9th Ronde van Drenthe
2020
 7th Giro dell'Appennino
2021
 6th Giro della Toscana
 8th Overall Deutschland Tour

Grand Tour general classification results timeline

References

External links
 

1988 births
Living people
Italian male cyclists
Sportspeople from Vicenza
Italian Giro d'Italia stage winners
European Games competitors for Italy
Cyclists at the 2019 European Games
Cyclists from the Province of Vicenza